Pennie & Edmonds was a New York City-based boutique law firm that focused on all aspects of intellectual property law. The firm practiced from 1883 until December 31, 2003, when it dissolved.

History
The firm's dissolution came in the wake of boutique IP firms losing ground to general practice firms – and, perhaps more acutely, the loss of key rainmakers. These were mostly patent litigation partners who took their clients to full-service firms (see book of business).

The departure of rainmaker Jonathan A. Marshall did not bode well for the firm. Marshall, a litigator with clients such as Hewlett-Packard, joined Weil Gotshal & Manges in 2002. With the firm's lease up for renewal and its partners unwilling to personally guarantee it, Pennie & Edmonds began exploring the possibility of a merger with other firms. However, a pending lawsuit for legal malpractice against the firm may have dissuaded other firms from such a merger. In the end, the firm's partners voted to dissolve the law firm. 

The Palo Alto office joined Philadelphia's Morgan, Lewis & Bockius, while much of the New York office joined Jones Day, a national firm.

Marshall later rejoined another IP boutique firm, Fish & Richardson, which has been rapidly expanding into the General Practice arena.

References

Defunct law firms of the United States
Law firms based in New York City
Law firms established in 1883
Defunct companies based in New York (state)
Law firms disestablished in 2003